Shangma is a town in Fushun County, Liaoning province, China. , it has 17 villages under its administration.

See also 
 List of township-level divisions of Liaoning

References 

Township-level divisions of Liaoning
Fushun County, Liaoning